The 2009–10 Eredivisie was the 50th season of the Eredivisie, the highest level of ice hockey competition in the Netherlands. The season started on November 13 following the quarterfinals of the league cup. Eight teams participated and played four times against each other in two home and two away games for a total of 28 league matches. The top six teams advanced to the playoffs with the top two teams receiving a bye into the semifinals. The Nijmegen Devils were the champions of both the regular season and playoffs.

Regular season

Playoffs

References

External links
 Results at official website

Neth
Eredivisie (ice hockey) seasons
Ere 
Ere